Forbidden Floor is a 2006 South Korean film and the second installment of the 4 Horror Tales film series. In this film, a mother and daughter move into a haunted apartment.

Cast
Kim Seo-hyung
Kim Yoo-jung
Jo Yeong-jin
Kim Yeong-seon
Kim Ja-yeong
Park Ah-in

External links 
 
 
 

2006 films
2006 horror films
Haunted house films
South Korean horror films
2000s Korean-language films
2000s South Korean films